Madeline Louise Eastman (born June 27, 1954) is an American jazz singer.

At 18, while watching the movie Lady Sings the Blues Eastman became enchanted with Diana Ross's portrayal of vocalist Billie Holiday. Not yet realizing how serious and dedicated she would need to be, Eastman considered becoming a jazz singer. She has listened to Miles Davis, particularly his 1960s quintet with Wayne Shorter, Herbie Hancock, Ron Carter, and Tony Williams. Among vocalists, her prime inspiration is Carmen McRae, in addition to Ella Fitzgerald and Sarah Vaughan. She began performing publicly in 1974 at Shenanigan's in Palo Alto.

Eastman has sung in Japan, Finland, New York City, San Francisco, and at the Cotati Jazz Festival, Monterey Jazz Festival, and the Glasgow Jazz Festival. She has taught at the Stanford Jazz Workshop and at the Jazzschool in Berkeley, California.

Eastman and vocalist Kitty Margolis started the record label Mad Kat. She has recorded with pianists Cedar Walton and Kenny Barron, saxophonist Phil Woods, bassist Rufus Reid, and drummer Tony Williams.

In 2004, Eastman won third place in the Down Beat magazine Readers' Poll for Best Female Jazz Vocalist and made the list of Talent Deserving Wider Recognition in the Critics' Poll.

Discography

References

1954 births
Living people
Jazz musicians from San Francisco
Singers from San Francisco
American jazz singers
American women jazz singers
21st-century American women